Dead Baby Bikes Downhill, also known as Dead Baby Bike Race or Dead Baby Downhill or RaceDay, is an annual Seattle-based bicycle race and street party.  The bicycle race often has no defined route, just an origin and an ending point, and has historically not been permitted, even though the accompanying street party has been permitted.

Over the years, the event has grown from attracting hundreds to now thousands of people to the Seattle neighborhood of Georgetown. 

The street party at times features carnival rides made of bicycle parts, as well as bicycle jousting.

The event was featured in a 2005 episode of the television show Grey's Anatomy.

History
The event was launched in 1997 by the members of the Dead Baby Bike Club (named for a doll which had been nailed to the wall of the roll-up door of the bike repair shop in which the club was meeting); founder Dave Ranstrom has admitted that if he had known the event would draw media attention, he would have chosen a different name.

References

Cycle races in the United States
Recurring sporting events established in 1997
Events in Seattle
Annual events in Washington (state)